Clarence Calvert "Sam" Covington (November 18, 1894 – January 4, 1963) was a professional baseball player.  He was a first baseman in parts of three seasons (1913, 1917–18) with the St. Louis Browns and Boston Braves.  For his career, he compiled a .178 batting average, with one home run and 14 runs batted in.

He was born and later died in Denison, Texas, at the age of 68. His brother Tex also played in the major leagues.

External links

1894 births
1963 deaths
St. Louis Browns players
Boston Braves players
Major League Baseball first basemen
Baseball players from Texas
Denison Blue Sox players
Birmingham Barons players
Little Rock Travelers players
Indianapolis Indians players
Louisville Colonels (minor league) players
Fort Smith Twins players